Harry Kehoe (born 7 November 1990) is an Irish sportsperson. He plays hurling with his local club Cloughbawn and has been a member of the Wexford senior team since 2009.

Honours

Waterford Institute of Technology
Fitzgibbon Cup: 2014

Cloughbawn
Wexford Intermediate Hurling Championship: 2019

Wexford
Leinster Senior Hurling Championship: 2019

References

1990 births
Living people
Waterford IT hurlers
Cloughbawn hurlers
Wexford inter-county hurlers